Blue Man (foaled 1949) was an American Thoroughbred racehorse best known for winning the Preakness Stakes.

Background
Blue Man was bred by Allen T. Simmons at his Lexington, Kentucky horse farm, a property that had been part of the renowned Idle Hour Stock Farm. Blue Man's dam was Poppycock, a granddaughter of Man o' War. His sire was Blue Swords, who won several handicaps and ran second to Count Fleet in the Kentucky Derby and Preakness Stakes. Grandsire Blue Larkspur was the 1929 American Horse of the Year and a U.S. Racing Hall of Fame inductee.

Blue Man was owned by Arthur Abbott of Rye, New York, founder of Abbott's Frozen Custard, who raced him under the White Oak Stable banner. He was trained by future Hall of Fame inductee Woody Stephens.

Racing career

Early races
At age two Blue Man showed limited racing ability. In the spring of 1952,  the then three-year-old colt won the important Flamingo Stakes at Hialeah Park in Florida. In the ensuing Kentucky Derby, he finished third to winner Hill Gail, then won the most important race of his career in the second leg of the U.S. Triple Crown series.

1952 Preakness Stakes
Derby winner Hill Gail had to be withdrawn from the Preakness as a result of an injury, but Blue Man still faced a solid field led by Walter M. Jeffords' highly regarded One Count, who was to be ridden by star jockey, Eddie Arcaro. Blue Man was ridden by Conn McCreary, a top jockey and future Hall of Fame inductee who had won the 1944 Preakness and was known for his dramatic come-from behind rides. In typical McCreary style, by the time he and Blue Man reached the three-quarter pole they were at the back of the pack, running ahead of just one other horse. One by one, they began passing the field, then pulled away in the homestretch to win by  lengths. For trainer Woody Stephens, Blue Man was his first of nine Preakness starters and his only winner.

Later races
Sent to compete in the final leg of the Triple Crown, the  mile Belmont Stakes, Blue Man ran second to  One Count. That year, Blue Man won other important races such as the Yankee Handicap at East Boston's Suffolk Downs and the Dwyer Stakes held that year at the Old Aqueduct Racetrack.

Stud record
Retired to stud duty, in 1958 Blue Man was sold to Canadian breeder Frank R. Conklin who stood him at his Midway Farm in Brantford, Ontario. Successful as a sire and damsire, Blue Man produced a number of Canadian stakes race winners.

Pedigree

Blue Man was inbred 3 x 3 to Man o' War, meaning that this stallion appears twice in the third generation of his pedigree.

References

1949 racehorse births
Racehorses bred in Kentucky
Racehorses trained in the United States
Preakness Stakes winners
Thoroughbred family 13-c